Luna de Xelajú is a very popular Guatemalan waltz composed by Paco Pérez in 1944.

The title translates as "Moon of Xelajú". "Xelajú" (pronounced sheh-lah-HOO) is the Kʼicheʼ Maya name for the Guatemalan city Quetzaltenango, still often popularly called "Xelajú" or "Xela".

The song was written to Miss Eugenia Cohen, a beautiful Jewish lady who stole the writer's heart, but eventually left him because Eugenia's parents disapproved of the relationship.  She lives in Quetzaltenango and Guatemala City to this day.

All of the great marimba bands of Guatemala have played it to great success. Perhaps one of the most popular recent versions is as the first selection of the CD Valses inolvidables de Guatemala, with the Guatemalan Millennium Orchestra under the baton of Maestro Dieter Lehnhoff.

The song has been performed by several musical acts, including Guatemalan singer and Grammy Award nominee, Gaby Moreno.

Song Lyrics
Although the song has lyrics, it is frequently performed instrumentally.

Popular Culture
Luna de Xelajú became a cult favorite among Macintosh users in the mid-1990s with the release of a novelty application called "Jared, the Butcher of Song" written and published by Freeverse Software. In the app, an 8-bit rendering of a smiley face attempts to sing the song with light guitar accompaniment.

References

External links
 

Guatemalan music
Guatemalan culture
Spanish-language songs